A Volume table is a chart to aid in the estimation of standing timber volume. These tables are based on volume equations and use correlations between certain aspects of a tree to estimate the volume to a degree of certainty. The diameter at breast height (DBH) and the merchantable height are used to determine the total volume. Difficulties occur when estimating the form class of the tree in question. The Mesavage and Girard form classes used to classify the trees to decide which volume table should be used. These volume tables are also based on different log rules such a Scribner, Doyle, and International ¼” scale.  In order to be effective, the proper form class must be selected as well as accurate DBH and height measurements.

History 
 
In 1804, Heinrich Cotta suggested the idea of a volume table. However, it was not carried out until 1846 when the Bavarian Government conducted an extensive study which was used to find the volume of entire stands rather than single trees.  From this, variations grew based on variables including growth rate, species, and site index.

Fundamentals

One of the most common ways to calculate volume of a standing tree or of a log is by using the Doyle log rule. This formula uses the small end diameter of a log (D) (in inches) along with the log length (L) (in feet) to estimate the volume of a log. The Doyle log rule on average under estimates the volume of a log. See formula below:

Doyle: Bd.Ft = 

Combining the Doyle log rule along with the Mesavage-Girard Form-Class, and Girard Upper-Log Taper Tables gives a quality estimation of log volume on and off stem. Using these Girard's tables one can estimate not only the first log of the tree but also the logs following the butt log.

References

Avery and Burkhart (2002). "Forest Measurements" Fifth addition.
USDA (2001). "Tables for Estimating Board-Foot Volume of Timber"

Further reading
 

Forest modelling